Franjo Krežma (4 September 1862 – 15 June 1881), also known as Franz Krezma in German-speaking countries, was a Croatian violinist and composer.

Family and education
Born in Osijek, Croatia, he showed interest for music in his early childhood and his talent was obvious in playing the violin and gave him a reputation of an authentic violin virtuoso. After moving to Zagreb he was taught by the violinist, composer and conductor Đuro (Gjuro) Eisenhuth. Krežma performed his first public concert on the 10.8.1870 in Sisak, at the very young age of 8, playing his violin with his three years older sister Anka (later Krežma-Barbot) backing him on the piano. Noticed and recommended by the Zagreb-born Austrian composer Leopold Alexander Zellner, he entered the music Conservatory of Vienna, Austria at the age of 9, as the youngest student ever, already then starting to compose, and completing studies before the age of 13, in the summer of 1875.

Career
Having finished his studies, Krežma started a spectacular European career, still backed by his sister. He was already at the age of 16 highly admired in cities across Europe like Rome, Prague, Genoa, Paris and Venice. On 1 July 1879, at the age of 16, he became the concert master at Benjamin Bilse's Bilse'sche Kapelle, the orchestra which would in the following years become Berlin Philharmonic.

Death and legacy
After a successful concert in Frankfurt am Main, Germany on 6 June 1881, Krežma developed an inflammation of the inner ear, which developed into meningitis in the following days. Following a belated surgery he never regained consciousness, dying on 15 June at the age of 18.

Highly respected and admired by famous musicians like Giuseppe Verdi, Henry Vieuxtemps, Franz Liszt with whom he once played both as a violinist and a composer, Franjo Krežma's surviving work, after a fire at his parents' home destroyed some of his it, along with his priceless violin, numbers one symphony, three overtures, several marches and dances for the orchestra, some works for a string quartet and some pieces for the violin.

Today, he is remembered in the name of an elementary school and through an international festival for young string instrument players in his native Osijek.

Notable works
Rêverie za violinu i veliki orkestar u As-duru (1880)

Selected recordings
Krezma - Lieder Natasa Antoniazzo, Mia Elezovic. Bella Musica 2021

References 

1862 births
1881 deaths
People from Osijek
Croatian musicians
Croatian violinists
Infectious disease deaths in Germany
Neurological disease deaths in Germany
Deaths from meningitis
19th-century violinists
Male violinists
19th-century male musicians